The División de Honor Femenina 2017–18, or Liga Guerreras Iberdrola 2017-18 after sponsorship of Iberdrola, was the 61st season of women's handball top flight in Spain since its establishment. Bera Bera won his fifth title. The season began on 6 September, 2017 and the last matchday was played on 26 May, 2018. A total of 14 teams took part the league, 12 of which had already contested in the 2016–17 season, and two of which were promoted from the División de Plata 2016–17.

Atlético Guardés won the championship with the same points as the 2nd team in the standings, Mecalia Atlético Guardés. Further, regarding to European competitions for 2018–19 season; Bera Bera qualified to EHF Champions League, Atlético Guardés qualified to EHF Cup and Rocasa G.C. and Mavi Nuevas Tecnologías to EHF Challenge Cup.

Promotion and relegation 
Teams promoted from 2016–17 División de Plata
ANTS:BFIT-MuchoTicket
BM Castellón

Teams relegated to 2018–19 División de Plata
ANTS:BFIT-MuchoTicket
BM Base Villaverde

Teams

Final standings

Top goalscorers

See also
Liga ASOBAL 2017–18

References

External links
Royal Spanish Handball Federation

División de Honor Femenina de Balonmano seasons
Division de Honor
2017–18 domestic handball leagues
2017 in women's handball
2018 in women's handball